Associated Humber Lines (AHL) was created in 1935 to manage the services of various railway controlled shipping lines including port activities in the Humber area of the United Kingdom. The ownership of the respective vessels did not transfer to A.H.L and similarly the ports concerned, Hull, Goole and Grimsby, also remained under the control of the railway companies and their successors.

The operation was formed by the amalgamation of the following companies' shipping services:
 London, Midland and Scottish Railway – Goole Steam Shipping Co. Ltd.
 Hull & Netherlands Steamship Co. Ltd.
 London and North Eastern Railway Company Ltd. [LNER]  – Great Central section
 London, Midland and Scottish Railway Company Ltd. – Goole services
 Wilson's and N.E.R. Shipping Co. Ltd  –  wholly owned by LNER

At formation, the joint service operated to 18 continental destinations.

History

In May 1935 the organisation was formed to takeover the management of the ships and ports and in June the control committee commenced to function and the process of rationalisation began.

At formation the fleet consisted of 30 ships from the following ownership:

London, Midland and Scottish Railway's – Goole Steam Shipping Co.Ltd.:

"Aire", "Alt", "Besline", "Besway", "Blyth", "Dearne", "Don", "Douglas", "Hebble", "Hodder", "Irwell", "Mersey", "Ouse", "Rother", "Rye", "Transport" and  "West Riding".

Hull and Netherlands S.S.Co.Ltd. (wholly owned subsidiary of LNER):

"Melrose Abbey" and "Jervaulx Abbey".

London & North Eastern Railway Co.Ltd. (LNER) (Great Central section):

"Accrington", "Bury", "Dewsbury", Felixstowe,"City of Bradford" and "City of Leeds".

Wilson's & N.E.R. Shipping Ltd. (LNER the majority shareholder):

"Harrogate", "Hull", "Selby" and "York".

At handover, two ships of the LNER were laid up – "City of Bradford" and "City of Leeds".

A listing of the ships details and their histories can be found below. 
  
By mid 1937 the integrated fleet had been reduced by six ships, and war losses in the managed fleet and the urgent need for vessels elsewhere around the U.K. for other services depleted the fleet further.

In 1957 the style became Associated Humber Lines Ltd., with the British Transport Commission being a 91 per cent shareholder and the balance of shares were held by Ellerman's Wilson Line. All the existing fleet at that time were transferred to the new entity and a fleet renewal programme was put in place.

The first of 8 newbuildings was delivered in 1958 and in 1959 A.H.L.'s operation was expanded to include the Hull-New Holland ferry service.

Control of A.H.L. was transferred to the Transport Holding Company in January 1963 and onwards again to the National Freight Corporation in 1969.

Having faced severe competition from short sea container operators and roll-on / roll-off ferries, operations declined and by 1968 had been reduced to just 2 container services from Hull to Rotterdam and Antwerp.  Losses were such that in November 1971 the A.H.L. operation was closed.  The final sailings from Antwerp and Rotterdam being performed by "Leeds" and "Melrose Abbey".

Livery

1935–1939: 
Funnel – Buff with red band touching black top with 'A H L' in black on red band. Hulls – Black with red boot topping. Fawn-Brown uppers with black vents.

1946 onwards: Uppers changed to white.

Houseflag – Blue with white disc.  Red letters 'A H L' on the white disc.

Routes
1935–1939: Goole to German, Dutch and Belgian Ports.
 
1935–1939: Goole to some French Ports with southern limit at Bordeaux.

1946–1964: Goole to Rotterdam and Amsterdam.

1946–1965: Goole to Copenhagen and Bremen.

1935–1939: Grimsby to Hamburg and Antwerp.

1935–1940: Grimsby to Rotterdam

1946–1967: Hull to Amsterdam, Bremen and Hamburg.

1946–1971: Hull to Antwerp and Rotterdam.

Ships transferred to A.H.L. management in 1935
 From London and North Eastern Railway (LNER)

 From Wilson's and N.E.R.Shipping

 From London, Midland and Scottish Railway – Goole Steam Shipping Co.

Rationalisation and war losses

A.H.L. suffered only relatively light losses to its fleet during World War II. Vessels lost were "Stockport", "Mersey", "Ouse" and "Rye".

Elsewhere, losses had been considerable and particularly badly hit were the Harwich fleet of the LNER. Consequently, the "Dewsbury" and "Accrington" were transferred in late 1945 and 1946 to that base on a permanent basis.

By 1948, the A.H.L. fleet had been reduced to:
 Based at Goole and all ex-LMS – Aire / Alt / Blyth / Dearne / Don / Hebble / Hodder / Irwell / Rother.
 Based at Hull –  Bury / Harrogate / Melrose Abbey / Selby.

By the end of 1962 the fleet had declined to:
 Ships with passenger carrying capability – Bolton Abbey / Melrose Abbey / Whitby Abbey / Byland Abbey / Kirkham Abbey .
 Cargo only vessels – Darlington / Harrogate / Leeds / Selby / Wakefield / York.

New building programme

Hull to New Holland ferry service
On 1 January 1959 management of this River Humber ferry service was transferred to AHL from the British Transport Commission – Eastern Region.

The three paddle steamers also operated excursions voyages on the river in season.

 Vessels in service at transfer of management

 Additional vessel employed from 1974

References

Bibliography

Transport in Lincolnshire
Transport in Yorkshire
Defunct shipping companies of the United Kingdom
Shipping companies of England